Andanoor is a village in the Gandaravakottai revenue block of Pudukkottai district, Tamil Nadu, India.

Demographics 
As per the 2001 census, Andanoor had a total population of 2423 with 1214 males and 1209 females. Out of the total
population 1146 people were literate.

References

Villages in Pudukkottai district